Louis Edward Gélineau (born May 3, 1928) is an American prelate of the Roman Catholic Church, serving as bishop of the Diocese of Providence from 1972 to 1997.

Since his retirement in 2004, Gelineau has been named in multiple lawsuits regards sexual abuse by priests in the diocese during his tenure as bishop.

Biography

Early life 
Louis Gélineau was born on May 3, 1928, into a Franco-American family in Burlington, Vermont, to Leonidas and Juliette (née Baribault) Gélineau ; he has an older brother, Robert. After attending St. Joseph's Elementary School and Cathedral High School in Burlington, he studied at St. Michael's College in Colchester, Vermont, for two years.  Gélineau then entered St. Paul's University in Ottawa, Ontario, obtaining a Licentiate of Sacred Theology and a Bachelor of Philosophy degree.

Priesthood 
Gélineau was ordained a priest by Bishop Edward Francis Ryan for the Diocese of Burlington on June 5, 1954. Gélineau was then assigned as assistant pastor at All Saints Parish in Richford, Vermont (1954–1956) and at St. Stephen Parish in Winooski, Vermont (1956–1957).

Gélineau was sent to Washington, D.C. to study at the Catholic University of America in 1957, earning a Licentiate of Canon Law in 1959. Returning to Vermont, he was named assistant chancellor of the diocese and secretary and master of ceremonies to Bishop Robert Joyce. He also served as director of the Society for the Propagation of the Faith and assistant chaplain at De Goesbriand Memorial Hospital in Vermont

Gélineau became chancellor of the diocese in 1961 and was raised to the rank of papal chamberlain by Pope John XXIII. In 1968, he became vicar general of the diocese and was elevated by the Vatican to prelate of his holiness.

Bishop of Providence 
On December 6, 1971, Pope Paul VI appointed Gélineau as the sixth bishop of the Diocese of Providence. He received his episcopal consecration on January 26, 1972, from Bishop Joyce, with Bishops Bernard Flanagan and Edward O'Leary serving as co-consecrators. In 1988, Gélineau declared that removing a feeding tube from 48-year-old Marcia Gray, a comatose Rhode Island woman, "does not contradict Catholic moral theology," but emphasized that he "in no way supports or condones the practice of euthanasia."

In 1985, Gélineau registered opposition to a 1985 ordinance for the City of Providence to protect LGBT people from discrimination in employment, housing, credit and access to public accommodations. He said, "Homosexual acts are contrary to God's command and contrary to his purpose in creating sex. To give support to this proposed legislation may easily be interpreted as supporting the homosexual lifestyle." In 1995, when the Rhode Island Senate passed an LGBT rights bill, Gélineau stated, "If [proposed legislation] seeks to afford protection from unjust discrimination, which is not now afforded under our laws, then those laws should be changed."

In a 1997 legal deposition, Robert Cadorette accused Gélineau of abusing him when Gélineau was a brother assigned to St. Joseph’s Orphanage in Burlington in the 1950's.  Cadorette claimed that on one occasion in 1951, Gélineau tried to pull down Cadorette's fly.  When Cadorette ran away, Gélineau caught and tried to drown him. In a 1997 legal deposition, Gélineau denied any sexual misdeeds with an altar server in 1994.

Retirement and legacy 
Gélineau submitted his letter of resignation as bishop of Providence to Pope John Paul II.  The pope accepted it on June 11, 1997. Gélineau became chaplain at St. Antoine Residence in North Smithfield, Rhode Island, in March 2004.

In a 2018 interview with the Providence Journal, Gélineau denied any intention to ever cover up sexual abuse crimes. On October 2, 2019, Gelineau and the diocese were named in a lawsuit by Philip Edwardo.  The plaintiff said that Gélineau  helped perpetrate sexual abuse by Philip Magaldi, a parish priest, against Edwardo when he was a minor between 1978 and 1983. On February 28, 2020, Gélineau and the diocese were sued by Robert Houllahan, who alleged sexual abuse by Normand Demers, a parish priest.  Houllahan claimed that Demers was also preying on other boys in Haitian orphanages and rectories in Rhode Island while the diocese was protecting him.  Citing his advanced age, Gélineau declined comment on the lawsuit

On March 21, 2020, Gélineau was accused by Jeannette Costa, a parishioner in Cranston, Rhode, of ignoring a sexual abuse accusation by her son in 1993 against Daniel Azzarone, the parish priest.  She sent a letter to Gélineau in June 1993 after her son told her that Azzerone had fondled him during the 1980's.  Costa was contacted in 1993 by a diocese lawyer who said that Azzarone's parish priest would watch over him. In response to this accusation in 2020, the diocese said that they reported Azzerone in 1993 to a state agency in Rhode Island that declined to prosecute him.  Azzerone remained in ministry.

On November 9, 2021, a Providence grand jury indicted James Silva, a diocese priest, on 11 counts of sexual assault between 1989 and 1990.  The Providence Journal article mentioned a 1980 lawsuit against Gelineau from parents of a boy in Burrillville, Rhode Island, who claimed Silva assaulted him.  Gélineau then transferred Silva to St. Lucy's parish in Middletown, Rhode Island, without notifying that parish or the authorities. When informed that Silva had molested a child at St. Lucy's, Gélineau's response was “Oh, no. Not again!"

See also

 Catholic Church hierarchy
 Catholic Church in the United States
 Historical list of the Catholic bishops of the United States
 List of Catholic bishops of the United States
 Lists of patriarchs, archbishops, and bishops

References

External links 
Roman Catholic Diocese of Providence Official Site
Official site of the Holy See

1928 births
Living people
People from Burlington, Vermont
Roman Catholic Diocese of Burlington
Roman Catholic bishops of Providence
20th-century Roman Catholic bishops in the United States
Catholic University of America alumni
Religious leaders from Vermont
Catholics from Vermont
American people of French-Canadian descent
Saint Michael's College alumni
American expatriates in Canada